Tommy Swerdlow (born 1962) is an American screenwriter, actor, and director.  He has appeared in such films as Howard the Duck (1986) and Spaceballs (1987) and co-wrote the screenplays of Cool Runnings (1993), Little Giants (1994) and Snow Dogs (2002).  Swerdlow made his directorial debut with the 2017 feature A Thousand Junkies.  He has also written a biopic about the life of Matisyahu titled King Without a Crown.

Filmography

Actor
The Wild Life (1984) - Dork
Real Genius (1985) - Bodie
Howard the Duck (1986) - Ginger Moss
Spaceballs (1987) - Troop Leader
Hamburger Hill (1987) - Pvt. Martin Bienstock
Child's Play (1988) - Detective Jack Santos
Blueberry Hill (1988) - Ray Porter
A Thousand Junkies (2017) - Tommy

Screenwriter
Cool Runnings (1993)
Little Giants (1994)
Bushwhacked (1995)
Snow Dogs (2002)
A Thousand Junkies (2017)
The Grinch (2018)
Puss in Boots: The Last Wish (2022)

Director
A Thousand Junkies (2017)

References

External links
https://tommyswerdlow.substack.com/ Tommy Swerdlow at Substack

1962 births
Living people
20th-century American male actors
21st-century American male actors
20th-century American screenwriters
21st-century American screenwriters